Stamford University may refer to:

Asia
Stamford University (Bangladesh)
Stamford International University (Thailand)

Europe
The legendary Stamford University founded by Bladud c. 740 BC
Stamford University (England), founded by Oxford rebels in 1333

North America
The Stamford campus of the University of Connecticut

See also
Stamford College (disambiguation)